Willis Walker (24 November 1892 − 3 December 1991) was an English footballer and County Cricketer. He played as a goalkeeper in the Football League for Leeds City, South Shields, Bradford Park Avenue and Stockport County. As a Nottinghamshire County cricketer, he was predominantly a batsman, scoring over a thousand first-class runs in a season on ten occasions.

Football career
Walker began his career at Sheffield United in 1911, though never made it into the first team. In 1912 he was bought by Midland League side Doncaster Rovers where he started off as understudy to Harry Bromage, and took over as first choice keeper for the 1913–14 season when he appeared in all 36 league fixtures.

Second Division Leeds City signed him in May 1914, but after 14 appearances the onset of war temporarily ended Football League matches. He played for Leeds during the war when he was able to, on 70 occasions altogether. When competition recommenced after the war, Walker was back in the side until Leeds City were suspended from the league.

In an auction of former Leeds players in 1919, Walker was bought for £800 by newly elected Second Division team South Shields and went on to play 201 league and FA Cup games for them over the nearly six seasons he was there.

Latterly he played for Bradford Park Avenue during the 1925–26 season and finished his career at Stockport County the following season.

Cricket career
Walker's cricket began at Sheffield United Cricket Club whilst he was playing football for Sheffield United. He later played county cricket for Nottinghamshire, making his debut in 1913, and going on to score 18,259 runs before ending his time with the county club in 1937. On joining the club he cut two years off his age as well as claiming he was born in the county. Despite a successful career he never played for England.

Personal life
Born in Gosforth, Northumberland, as a boy he moved south to the Wiseton Estate, near Retford, Nottinghamshire when his father found work there. During the First World War, he served in the Royal Navy.

In 1919 Walker began selling football, cricket and tennis equipment from his home in Keighley. This business soon moved to a series of shops in the town where his son and then grandsons later took over, until its closure in 2012.

Willis Walker died in East Morton near Keighley in 1991 aged 99.

References

1892 births
1991 deaths
People from Gosforth
Cricketers from Tyne and Wear
Footballers from Tyne and Wear
English footballers
Association football goalkeepers
Sheffield United F.C. players
Doncaster Rovers F.C. players
Leeds City F.C. players
South Shields F.C. (1889) players
Bradford (Park Avenue) A.F.C. players
Stockport County F.C. players
English Football League players
Midland Football League players
English cricketers
Nottinghamshire cricketers
North v South cricketers
People from Wiseton
Footballers from Nottinghamshire
Cricketers from Nottinghamshire
Cricketers from Keighley
English cricketers of 1890 to 1918
English cricketers of 1919 to 1945
Royal Navy personnel of World War I